Yirol West County is an administrative area in Lakes State, South Sudan. it is one the eight counties of lakes state.

References

Counties of South Sudan